Robert Grundtmann Tenement is a building in downtown Bydgoszcz, at 1 Słowackiego Street.

Location
The habitation house stands on eastern side of Gdańska Street at the intersection with Słowackiego street.

History
The house was built in 1905-1906 by architect Alfred Schleusener, for a retired colonel of the Prussian army, Robert Grundtmann. The initial address was 1 Bismarckstraße/137 Danzigerstraße.
Alfred Schleusener has been working in Bydgoszcz between 1902 and 1944. Among other realizations, he designed also:
 His own house standing at 62 Gdańska street;
 Tenement Carl Meinhardt standing at 27 Gdańska street.

The building housed one of the most famous Bydgoszcz's cafe: Cafe Metropol then Elite.

From 1909 till the end of WWI, a photographer studio Samson & Co. was active (cf Gallery).

During the interwar period, Paweł Dzionara, a member of the Supreme People's Council, independence activist and city councilor had his office in the building.

During Polish People's Republic, the tenement housed the restaurant SIM.

Architecture 
The building is decorated in the style of early modernism, characterized by a desire to simplify and find geometrical forms of elevation. The building has a massive body, with simple details and axial composition components. The metal roof is highlighted by a ridge turret.

Inside, there is an original elevator dating back from the time of construction, with a wrought iron decoration in Art Nouveau style.

Gallery

See also

 Bydgoszcz
 Gdanska Street in Bydgoszcz
 Słowackiego Street in Bydgoszcz
 Alfred Schleusener
  Downtown district in Bydgoszcz

References

Bibliography
  

Cultural heritage monuments in Bydgoszcz
Buildings and structures on Gdańska Street, Bydgoszcz
Residential buildings completed in 1906
1906 establishments in Germany
Modernist architecture in Bydgoszcz